In enzymology, a 6-pyruvoyltetrahydropterin 2'-reductase is an enzyme that catalyzes the chemical reaction

6-lactoyl-5,6,7,8-tetrahydropterin + NADP+  6-pyruvoyltetrahydropterin + NADPH + H+

Thus, the two substrates of this enzyme are 6-lactoyl-5,6,7,8-tetrahydropterin and NADP+, whereas its 3 products are 6-pyruvoyltetrahydropterin, NADPH, and H+.

This enzyme belongs to the family of oxidoreductases, specifically those acting on the CH-OH group of donor with NAD+ or NADP+ as acceptor. The systematic name of this enzyme class is 6-lactoyl-5,6,7,8-tetrahydropterin:NADP+ 2'-oxidoreductase. Other names in common use include 6-pyruvoyltetrahydropterin reductase, 6PPH4(2'-oxo) reductase, 6-pyruvoyl tetrahydropterin (2'-oxo)reductase, 6-pyruvoyl-tetrahydropterin 2'-reductase, and pyruvoyl-tetrahydropterin reductase. This enzyme participates in folate biosynthesis.

References 

 

EC 1.1.1
NADPH-dependent enzymes
Enzymes of unknown structure